is a 1957 black-and-white Japanese film directed by Masahisa Sunohara.

Cast 
 Chiemi Eri
 Yujiro Ishihara
 Taiji Tonoyama
 Isamu Kosugi

References 

Japanese black-and-white films
1957 films
Films directed by Masahisa Sunohara
Nikkatsu films
1950s Japanese films